Career of Nikos Dyzma (also known as Kariera Nikosia Dyzmy in Polish) is a 2002 Polish film directed by Jacek Bromski. The film is a mordant contemporary satire loosely based on the 1932 novel The Career of Nicodemus Dyzma by Tadeusz Dołęga-Mostowicz, which narrates the story of a crude opportunist from the countryside, whose vulgarity, mistaken by the Polish elite in the capital for canny insight, facilitates his rise through the social and political ranks of the nation. The same novel also inspired the 1979 American film Being There.

Cast 
 Cezary Pazura as Nikodem, "Nikos" Dyzma
 Anna Przybylska as Jadzia, the wife of the minister Jaszuński
 Ewa Kasprzyk as Senator Anna Walewska
 Andrzej Grabowski as Roman Kiliński
 Krzysztof Globisz as Minister Jaszuński
 Krzysztof Pieczynski as Kropiel
 Olgierd Łukaszewicz as Prime Minister
 Lew Rywin as Terkowski
 Katarzyna Figura as Nurse

Awards
 Eagles
year: 2003
Type: appointment
Award: Eagle
Category: Best Costume Design (Margaret Braszka)

 Golden Ducks
year: 2003
Type: appointment
Award: Golden Duck
Category: Best Polish actress (Anna Przybylska)

 Golden Lions
year: 2002
Type: appointment
Award: Golden Lions
Category: Participation in the main competition (Jacek Bromski)

Other Information

Period Picture: October 10 - November 21, 2001.

Landscapes: Pabianice (Lutheran Cemetery), Lodz (Poznanski Palace Street. Ogrodowa, ul. Marathon, rector Film School - Film Walewska senator's office, the rector of the Academy of Medicine - a film cabinet minister Jaszuńskiego, home of "Polonia", Al. Mickiewicza - film study Kilińskiego, a hypermarket M1, Poniatowski Park, st. Wolczanska requested to fill at the hospital), Wola, near Lodz Błędowska (golf course), Leśmierz (refinery), Warsaw, Gdynia (port).

Gala premiere took place March 7, 2002 in Lodz, in the cinema "Baltic" and the March 14, 2002 in Warsaw at the cinema 'Cinematheque. "

In 2002, the film received an award of the Association "Polish Cinemas - Golden Ticket for a fourth place ranking in the audience.

The film can be confused with the Polish comedy of manners in 1956 under the title "Nicodemus Dyzma"

The film can be confused with the Polish soap opera from 1980, which is a soap opera costume and satire titled "The Career of Nicodemus Dyzma"

Sound: Janusz Bouillon and Michael Kosterkiewicz

References

External links
 Excellent review 
 
Career of Nikos Dyzma on Filmweb

2002 films
Films based on works by Tadeusz Dołęga-Mostowicz
Polish drama films
2000s Polish-language films